Eric Norman Jones (5 February 1915 – 2 October 1985) was an English footballer who played for Kidderminster Harriers, Wolverhampton Wanderers, Portsmouth, Stoke City, West Bromwich Albion, Brentford, and Crewe Alexandra. After the war he managed BSC Young Boys (Switzerland), Beerschot (Belgium), and De Graafschap (Netherlands).

Playing career
Jones played for Kidderminster Harriers, Wolverhampton Wanderers, Portsmouth, Stoke City and West Bromwich Albion. During the war he guested for Portsmouth, Chelsea, Watford, Southend United, Tottenham Hotspur, Arsenal, Queens Park Rangers, Crystal Palace, Northampton Town, Fulham and Exeter City. After the war he continued his career with Brentford and then Crewe Alexandra.

Management career
Jones managed Swiss side BSC Young Boys, leading the club to a seventh-place finish in the Nationalliga A in 1950–51. After leaving the Wankdorf Stadium, he took charge at Belgian club Beerschot. He later took charge at Dutch Tweede Divisie club De Graafschap.

He was appointed Port Vale's trainer-coach in June 1962, introducing revolutionary intensive training sessions for the players. He had to be taken off the pitch during his first match with the club after being struck by a bottle thrown from the crowd at Wrexham's Racecourse Ground. In his autobiography, Colin Grainger claimed that Jones were extremely unpopular with the squad and that the bottle had actually been thrown by a player. His approach of strict discipline was apparently not favoured by the board either and he resigned his post at Vale Park for domestic reasons in October 1962.

Personal life 
Jones served in the Royal Artillery during the Second World War.

Career statistics

References

1915 births
1985 deaths
Military personnel from Birmingham, West Midlands
Footballers from Birmingham, West Midlands
English footballers
Association football outside forwards
Kidderminster Harriers F.C. players
Wolverhampton Wanderers F.C. players
Portsmouth F.C. players
Stoke City F.C. players
West Bromwich Albion F.C. players
Chelsea F.C. wartime guest players
Watford F.C. wartime guest players
Southend United F.C. wartime guest players
Tottenham Hotspur F.C. wartime guest players
Arsenal F.C. wartime guest players
Queens Park Rangers F.C. wartime guest players
Crystal Palace F.C. wartime guest players
Northampton Town F.C. wartime guest players
Fulham F.C. wartime guest players
Exeter City F.C. wartime guest players
Brentford F.C. wartime guest players
Brentford F.C. players
Crewe Alexandra F.C. players
English Football League players
English football managers
De Graafschap managers
Association football coaches
Port Vale F.C. non-playing staff
English expatriate sportspeople in Switzerland
English expatriate sportspeople in the Netherlands
English expatriate sportspeople in Belgium
English expatriate football managers
Expatriate football managers in Switzerland
Expatriate football managers in the Netherlands
Expatriate football managers in Belgium
British Army personnel of World War II
Royal Artillery personnel